Spanish Lake is a lake in the Diablo Range, in Fresno County, California.

References 

  	
Lakes of Fresno County, California
Diablo Range